Ebbw Vale railway station can refer to

 Ebbw Vale railway station, Ipswich, Australia
 Ebbw Vale (High Level) railway station, South Wales
 Ebbw Vale (Low Level) railway station, South Wales
 Ebbw Vale Parkway railway station, South Wales
 Ebbw Vale Town railway station, South Wales